Gastón Matías Bueno Sciutto (born 2 February 1985) is an Uruguayan professional footballer who plays for Montevideo Wanderers, as a defender.

Career
Born in Montevideo, Bueno has played for Defensor Sporting, Sambenedettese, Juventud de Las Piedras, Progreso, Central Español, Danubio and Montevideo Wanderers.

References

1985 births
Living people
Uruguayan footballers
Defensor Sporting players
A.S. Sambenedettese players
Juventud de Las Piedras players
C.A. Progreso players
Central Español players
Danubio F.C. players
Montevideo Wanderers F.C. players
Uruguayan Primera División players
Association football defenders
Uruguayan expatriate footballers
Uruguayan expatriate sportspeople in Italy
Expatriate footballers in Italy